The 1982 PBA Reinforced Filipino Conference Finals was the best-of-7 basketball championship series of the 1982 PBA Reinforced Filipino Conference, and the conclusion of the conference playoffs. This is the first championship series in the PBA that was contested in a best-of-seven format.

The Toyota Super Corollas won against San Miguel Beermen in the finals series that went the full route of seven games.

Qualification

Games summary

Game 1

Game 2

San Miguel rallied from a 19-point deficit, trailed 70–89 in the third period, the Beermen relied on the ballhawking of veteran Yoyong Martirez, the hustling of Melchor Ravanes and the shooting of Manny Paner. Martirez took four crucial steals to move the Beermen to within 90–97, they seize the lead, 116–113, with 37 ticks left. Ramon Fernandez and Terry Saldaña scored on four free throws and Norman Black made one charity for a tie at 117, sending the match to a pulsating finish with 14 seconds to go, the Beermen worked up 12 seconds to set up the final basket and Norman Black responded with his jumper in front of the San Miguel bench.

Game 3

With Toyota ahead by three, 88–85, in the last 19 seconds, Beermen Alex Tan muffed his charities and Marte Saldaña missed a long three-point attempt, Francis Arnaiz converted his two free throws in the last nine seconds to ice the game, 90–85 for Toyota.

Game 4

Toyota scored six points in the last 64 seconds with Arnie Tuadles converting on a fastbreak pitch by Abe King in the last 13 seconds to enable the Super Corollas to save a solid game from another disastrous end, the Beermen battled back from a 12-point deficit and had victory on hand with 1:08 left with a four-point margin, 96–92.

Game 5

San Miguel limited Toyota to only 13 points in the final period, the Corollas got only four field goals, including Ramon Fernandez' three-pointer and four free throws in the last 12 minutes. Arnie Tuadles was ejected from the game with 8:41 left in the fourth quarter for tripping Norman Black.

Game 6

Abe King's defensive chores held Norman Black to his lowest production of 41 points, Toyota forged ahead by 18 points at the start of the third quarter, 81–63, on 12 quick points by King, Tuadles and Koonce, the Beermen struggled to within six points, 86–92, but Koonce and Ramon Fernandez combined for a 100–92 Toyota lead with 2:55 left.

Game 7

The Super Corollas banked on a series of free throws by Donnie Ray Koonce, who hit 13 of his 27 points in the fourth quarter, Toyota exploited San Miguel's dilemma on penalty situation to keep the lead, 99–91 with 1:02 left. Anthony Dasalla completed a Black' assist under the goal and Rudy Lalota converted on a bad inbound by Koonce as the Beermen put their last stand with 1:42 to go, Toyota was in control by then, the Toyota fans spilled into the hardcourt even before the final buzzer ending the best-of-seven series.

Rosters

Broadcast notes

References

1982
1982 PBA season
San Miguel Beermen games
Toyota Super Corollas games
PBA Reinforced Filipino Conference Finals
PBA Reinforced Filipino Conference Finals